Daniel Johansen Elmhari (born 15 June 1999), better known as Daniel Owen, is a Norwegian singer and dancer. He won season four of Norske Talenter in 2011 and will took part in Melodi Grand Prix 2021 with the song "Psycho".

Early life
He was born on 15 December 1999 in Ellingsrud, a neighbourhood in the borough of Alna in the north-east part of Oslo, Norway. He attended Ellingsrud Primary School and went to Edvard Munch High School.

Career

2011–2020: Norske Talenter and career beginnings
In 2011, Owen won the forth season of Norske Talenter, a Norwegian talent show with a similar format to Britain's Got Talent, making it one of the Got Talent franchise programmes. On 14 February 2015, he released his debut single "Girl Gone Bad". On 6 November 2015, he released the single "With You". On 10 March 2017, he released the single "Devils & Angels". On 3 November 2017, he released the single "Vibe with Me". On 15 June 2018, he released the single "Going Wild". On 30 November 2018, he released the single "Take a Chance on Me". On 24 May 2019, he released the single "Back to Where We Started". On 8 November 2019, he released the single "Fine". On 4 December 2020, he released the single "No Plan to This".

2021: Melodi Grand Prix
On 18 January 2021, he released the single "Psycho", on the same day he was announced as one of the acts to take part in Melodi Grand Prix 2021, he performed during the second heat, which took place on 23 January 2021, he made it to the gold duel but did not advance to the Final. He performed in the second chance round which took place on 15 February 2021, he did not advance to the Final and was eliminated from the competition.

He's now working on an EP project that will be released during 2021.

Discography

Singles

Music videos

References

1999 births
Living people
Melodi Grand Prix contestants